Prelude in C may refer to:

 Prelude in C major (disambiguation)
 Prelude in C minor (disambiguation)
 Prelude in C-sharp minor (disambiguation)